Edith Massey (born Edith Dornfield; May 28, 1918 – October 24, 1984) was an American actress and singer. Massey was best known for her appearances in a series of movies by director John Waters. She was one of the Dreamlanders, Waters's stable of regular cast and crew members.

Early life 
Born Edith Dornfield on May 28, 1918, in New York City, she was the daughter of Samuel and Bessie (Lansnek) Dornfield. Samuel, who was born in Austria or Ukraine, died about five months after Massey's birth.

The 1920 United States Federal Census recorded Edith, age one, living on Lewis Street in Manhattan, New York, with her three-year-old sister, Etta, and their widowed mother, Bessie, who was 22 years old. The following year, on March 9, 1921, Bessie married her second husband, Max Grodsky, in Denver, Colorado.

According to Massey's half-brother, Morris Grodsky, their parents "just threw up their hands one day, dropped off those who couldn't fend for themselves at a local orphanage or 'home,' and disappeared". Massey's mother died March 1, 1925.

In the 1975 documentary Love Letter to Edie, Massey said she was raised in an orphanage and eventually was placed in a foster home. Her foster family members were cruel to her and, as a teenager, she ran away to Hollywood. In the documentary Divine Waters (1981), Massey explained that she was "born in New York, but raised in Denver....I was movie crazy, so I went to California to try and get in the movies, but instead I became a barmaid."

In 1946, Massey married a soldier in Reno, leaving him about five years later because she got "restless". 
However, in Divine Waters, Massey said that the marriage lasted "about seven years. It was my fault; I left him for another man, so I blame myself for it."

She worked in several odd jobs through the years, and she eventually relocated to Baltimore, Maryland where she worked as a barmaid at Pete's Hotel in the Fell's Point neighborhood. Filmmaker John Waters met Massey while she was working at Pete's Hotel in 1969 and offered her a role as herself in the film Multiple Maniacs. In the early 1970s, she quit her job at Pete's and opened a thrift store called Edith's Shopping Bag, also in Fell's Point.

Collaboration with John Waters 
Massey gained a cult following from her appearances in five films directed by John Waters: Multiple Maniacs (1970), in which she appeared as herself and, in a dream sequence, as the Virgin Mary; Pink Flamingos (1972), playing Divine's egg-loving mother, Edie; Female Trouble (1974), as Aunt Ida; Desperate Living (1977), as the evil Queen Carlotta of Mortville; and in her final role in a Waters film, Polyester (1981), as Cuddles Kovinsky.

Later career and death 
In the late 1970s and early 1980s, Massey capitalized on the infamy of Waters's films by touring as the lead singer of a punk band, Edie and the Eggs. She also posed for a series of greeting cards. Later, when the Baltimore winters became too much for her to endure, she moved to Venice, California, where she opened another thrift store with the money she earned from acting in Waters's films. In 1980, she was featured in John Mellencamp's music video for "This Time" and also appears on the cover of Mellencamp's album Nothin' Matters and What If It Did.

In 1982, Massey recorded a cover of The Four Seasons' "Big Girls Don't Cry" that was included on the compilation albums The Rhino Brothers Present the World's Worst Records and A Date With John Waters.

The year she died, Massey starred in her final film, Mutants in Paradise. She read for a role in Paul Bartel's Western parody Lust in the Dust (1985) opposite longtime co-star Divine, but actress Nedra Volz was cast instead.

Massey died of complications of lymphoma and diabetes on October 24, 1984 in Los Angeles. Her body was cremated, and her ashes were scattered in the Garden of Roses at Westwood Village Memorial Park Cemetery in Los Angeles.

Legacy
Director Robert Maier made a "mockumentary" short about her in 1975 titled Love Letter to Edie. There is a director's authorized version re-mastered from his original 16mm color film footage.

Filmography

References

External links 
 
 

1918 births
1984 deaths
20th-century American actresses
Actresses from Denver
American film actresses
Burials at Westwood Village Memorial Park Cemetery
Deaths from cancer in California
Deaths from diabetes
Deaths from lymphoma
Women punk rock singers
People from Greater Los Angeles
20th-century American singers
20th-century American businesspeople
20th-century American women singers
20th-century American businesswomen